Mounsef (also spelled al-Mounsif) is a municipality in the Byblos District of  Keserwan-Jbeil Governorate, Lebanon. It located off the Mediterranean coast and is 47 kilometers north of Beirut. Mounsef has an average elevation of 220 meters above sea level and a total land area of 341 hectares. Its inhabitants are predominantly Greek Orthodox Christians.

References

Populated places in Byblos District
Eastern Orthodox Christian communities in Lebanon